Vadensea is a genus of flowering plants belonging to the family Icacinaceae.

Its native range is Tanzania to Southern Africa.

Species:
 Vadensea oblongifolia (Engl.) Jongkind & O.Lachenaud 
 Vadensea tenuifolia (Oliv.) Jongkind & O.Lachenaud 
 Vadensea testui Jongkind & O.Lachenaud 
 Vadensea vogelii (Miers) Jongkind & O.Lachenaud

References

Icacinaceae
Asterid genera